The Altenburger Trumpeter is a breed of fancy pigeon developed over many years of selective breeding. Altenburger Trumpeters along with other breeds of domesticated pigeons are all descendants from the rock pigeon (Columba livia). There are several breeds of trumpeter pigeons which are known for their vocal cooing which sounds similar to laughter or trumpeting. The breeds with this ability are collectively known as "voice" pigeons.

See also 

List of pigeon breeds
Bokhara Trumpeter

References

Pigeon breeds